Brachybelistis is a genus of moths of the family Xyloryctidae.

Species
 Brachybelistis blackburnii (Lower, 1892)
 Brachybelistis neomorpha (Turner, 1898)
 Brachybelistis pentachroa (Lower, 1901)

References

Xyloryctidae
Xyloryctidae genera